Tavira is a Portuguese town and municipality, capital of the Costa do Acantilado, situated in the east of the Algarve on the south coast of Portugal. The Gilão River meets the Atlantic Ocean in Tavira. The population in 2011 was 26,167, in an area of 606.97 km2. Tavira is the Portuguese representative community for the inscription of the Mediterranean Diet as a Intangible Cultural Heritage of Humanity of UNESCO.

History

Bronze Age to the Roman Empire

Tavira's origins date back to the late Bronze Age (1,000-800 BC). In the 8th century BC it became one of the first Phoenician settlements in the Iberian West. The Phoenicians created a colonial urban center here with massive walls, at least two temples, two harbours and a regular urban structure which lasted until the end of 6th century BC, when it was destroyed by conflict.

It is thought its original name was Baal Saphon, named after the Phoenician Thunder and Sea god. The Romans later called it Balsa.

After laying abandoned for a century, it was revived and became an even larger settlement during the so-called Tartessian Period of Tavira, was again abandoned by the end of the 4th century BC. Another urban center emerged at nearby Cerro do Cavaco, a fortified hill occupied until the time of Emperor Augustus.

The Roman Empire to the Moorish Conquest
Balsa became a big town, in fact much bigger than Tavira, that grew, prospered and decayed in parallel with the Roman Empire. When the Moors conquered Iberia, in the 8th century, Balsa was already extinct as a town.

Under Roman rule, Tavira was a secondary passing place on the important road between Balsa and Baesuris (today Castro Marim).

Moorish Rule

The Moorish occupation of Tavira between the 8th and 13th centuries left its mark on the agriculture, architecture and culture of the area. That influence can still be seen in Tavira today with its whitewashed buildings, Moorish style doors and rooftops. The Tavira Castle, two mosques and palaces were built by the Moors. The impressive seven arched "Roman bridge" is now not considered to be Roman after a recent archaeological survey, but originates from a 12th-century Moorish bridge. This was a good time economically for Tavira, which established itself as an important port for sailors and fishermen. The area remained rural until the 11th century when Moorish Tavira (from the Arabic Tabira, "the hidden") grew rapidly, becoming one of the important towns of the then Gharb al-Andalus (the west), today's Algarve.

The Reconquista
In 1242 Dom Paio Peres Correia took Tavira back from the Moors in a bloody conflict of retaliation after seven of his principal Knights were killed during a period of truce. Dom Paio's Christian troops decimated most of Tavira's population and the few survivors were kept in a tiny quarter known as "Mouraria".

The 1755 earthquake

In the 18th century, the port on its river was of considerable importance for shipping produce such as salt, dried fish and wine. 
Like most of the Algarve, its buildings were virtually all destroyed by the earthquake of 1755. 
This earthquake is thought to have reached 8.5–9.0 on the moment magnitude scale and caused extensive damage throughout the Algarve due to high intensity shaking (XI (Extreme) on the Mercalli intensity scale) and tsunamis.

Demographics

Tavira today

The city has since been rebuilt with many fine 18th-century buildings along with its 37 churches. A bridge links the two parts of the town across the River Gilão.
The church of Santa Maria do Castelo, built on the ruins of a mosque, holds the tombs of Dom Paio Peres Correia and his knights.
The church dates back to the 13th century, with the clock tower having been recreated from what was once a minaret. A bust of Dom Paio who died in Tavira in 1275, can be seen on the corner of the town hall.

At one time fishing was the area's primary industry but that declined, partly due to the changing migration patterns of tuna fish and advancing silt in the river Gilão.

The population is in the region of 25,000 inhabitants (municipality of Tavira) supporting a military base. Although still relatively untouched by mass tourism, there are several golf courses in the vicinity. The local beach lies past the salt pans and can be reached via the nearby Santa Luzia footbridge or by ferry, taking visitors to the sand-bar island known as Ilha de Tavira, part of the Ria Formosa natural wetlands park.

In recent years the Gran Plaza shopping centre, incorporating a cinema, supermarket shops, and restaurants, was built on the outskirts of the town. House prices have increased sharply in recent years. The development of many golf clubs close to the town has also had an effect.

As one of the popular towns in the Algarve, Tavira benefits from tourism which is the primary aspect of the region's economy.

Climate 
Tavira has a hot-summer Mediterranean climate (Köppen Csa) with hot, dry summers and mild, wet winters. Together with Faro, it is among the sunniest cities in Portugal and in Europe, typically averaging around 3,150 hours of sunshine. Due to its location on the Algarvian Sotavento, Tavira is sheltered from frontal systems coming from the west but exposed to the influences of humid air masses coming from the south. The city receives predominantly western winds. Temperatures below  are registered, on average, once a year. In contrast to the western coasts of Portugal, fog is very uncommon in Tavira, occurring on average only three times a year.

Parishes

Administratively, the municipality is divided into 6 civil parishes (freguesias):

 Conceição e Cabanas de Tavira
 Cachopo
 Luz de Tavira e Santo Estêvão
 Santa Catarina da Fonte do Bispo
 Santa Luzia
 Tavira (Santa Maria e Santiago)

Transport
Tavira has its own railway station on the line from Vila Real de Santo António to Faro and Lagos. Trains are operated by Comboios de Portugal (CP). Connections are available at Faro station for trains to Lisbon and the rest of Portugal.

The A22 toll motorway passes near to the town. This offers fast road access along the Algarve coast and eastwards to Seville.

The nearest international airports are Faro and Seville.

International relations

Tavira is twinned with:

 Kenitra, Morocco
 Łańcut, Poland
 Perpignan, France
 Porto Novo, Cape Verde
 Punta Umbría, Spain
 San Bartolomé de la Torre, Spain

Notable people 

 The Corte-Real family nobles originated in the 14th century in Tavira
 Diogo de Mendonça Corte-Real (1658–1736) a diplomat and statesman
 Józef Karol Konrad Chełmicki (1814-1890) a Polish-born Portuguese general
 Estácio da Veiga (1828–1891) a Portuguese archeologist
 António Cabreira (1868–1953) aristocrat, mathematician, polygraph and publicist
 Álvaro de Campos (1890–1935) heteronym of the poet Fernando Pessoa, known for his powerful and wrathful writing

Sport 
 Miguel Cabrita (born 1974) swimmer, competed at the 1992 and 1996 Summer Olympics
 Fernando Livramento (born 1982) a former footballer with 369 club caps

See also

Tavira DOC
Tavira Island

References

External links

Website of the Municipality (in Portuguese)
Arkeotavira: Archaeology, History and Old Maps

 
Cities in Portugal
Populated places in Faro District
Municipalities of the Algarve
Towns of the Algarve
Seaside resorts in Portugal
Municipalities of Faro District
Phoenician colonies in Portugal